Incomplete list of Western Bloc intelligence agents, military personnel, scientists, politicians, diplomats, and other prominent people who defected to Eastern Bloc or non-aligned countries during the Cold War.

See also 
 List of Soviet and Eastern Bloc defectors
 List of Cold War pilot defections
 South Korean defectors

References 

Western Bloc
 
 
Def